Tukumach'ay or Tuku Mach'ay (Quechua tuku owl, t'uqu a niche in the wall, mach'ay a cave, a niche in the wall Hispanicized spelling Tucu Machay) is a mountain in the Andes of Peru, about  high. It is situated in the Junín Region, Yauli Province, Yauli District. Tukumach'ay lies southeast of the Antikuna mountain pass and south of Waqraqucha.

References

Mountains of Peru
Mountains of Junín Region